Helianthus salicifolius is a North American species of sunflower known by the common name willowleaf sunflower. It is native to the central United States, primarily in the Great Plains and Ozark Plateau (states of Missouri, Kansas, Oklahoma, and Texas). There are a few reports of scattered populations in the Northeast and Midwest parts of the country, but these appear to be escapes from cultivation.

Helianthus salicifolius grows in limestone prairies. One plant usually produces 6-15 flower heads, each containing 10-20 yellow ray florets surrounding 50 or more red disc florets.

References

External links
Photo of herbarium specimen at Missouri Botanical Garden, collected in Missouri in 1992

salicifolius
Flora of the United States
Plants described in 1834